Robert Hinks (20 November 1918 – 14 December 1995) was an Irish hurler who played as a right wing-back for the Kilkenny senior team.

Born in Carrickshock, County Kilkenny, Hinks first played competitive hurling whilst at school at Mount Sion CBS. He arrived on the inter-county scene at the age of seventeen when he first linked up with the Kilkenny minor team. He made his senior debut during the 1939 championship. Hinks went on to enjoy a brief career, winning one All-Ireland medal and two Leinster medals.

As a member of the Leinster inter-provincial team Hinks won nine Railway Cup medal as captain. At club level he was a five-time championship medallist with Carrickshock.

References

1918 births
1995 deaths
Carrickshock hurlers
Kilkenny inter-county hurlers
Leinster inter-provincial hurlers
All-Ireland Senior Hurling Championship winners